Schadonia or commonly known as Schadonia alpina is a genus of lichenized fungi in the family Ramalinaceae with a crustose growth habit.

References

Ramalinaceae
Lichen genera
Lecanorales genera